"Too Drunk" is the eleventh single by Buckcherry and their first from their fourth album Black Butterfly. The song is about a man drinking all night and all day, and having the girl of his desire walk away because he's "too drunk to fuck". The song was apparently leaked by the band's manager in 2008, yet the band later claimed that the track was pirated.

The song was removed from re-releases and clean versions of the album and replaced by their cover of "Highway Star" from Deep Purple that was used by NASCAR on TNT as its 2009 theme song.

Music video
The video features a house party, during which the band is shown playing, and a couple are shown having sex in various places. Pornographic actors Ashlynn Brooke and Tommy Gunn (her then boyfriend) make cameos as the couple engaged in the act.

Charts

References

Buckcherry songs
2008 singles
Songs about alcohol
Songs written by Josh Todd
Songs written by Keith Nelson (musician)
Songs written by Marti Frederiksen
Atlantic Records singles
Eleven Seven Label Group singles
2008 songs